Edson Francisco Celulari (born 20 March 1958) is a Brazilian actor.

Biography 
Celulari was a member of Porão 7, an amateur theater company from São Carlos. When he was 16 years old, he moved to São Paulo to study at the University of São Paulo's Dramatic Art School. Celulari debuted on television in 1978, on TV Tupi's telenovela Salário Minimo. Since then Celulari acted in several TV, film and stage productions.

He was married to fellow actress Cláudia Raia from 1993 to 2010. They acted together in the telenovelas Deus nos Acuda and Torre de Babel.

Television 
 1978 – Salário Mínimo
 1979 – Gaivotas : Mário
 1980 –  : Ivan
 1980 – Plumas & Paetês : Kurlan
 1981 – Ciranda de Pedra : Sérgio
 1982 – O Homem Proibido : Carlos
 1983 – Guerra dos Sexos : Zenon da Silva
 1983 – Louco Amor : Marcelo Paiva (cameo)
 1984 – Amor com Amor Se Paga : Tomás Correia
 1985 – Um Sonho a Mais : Joaquim
 1986 – Cambalacho : Thiago Souza e Silva
 1987 – Sassaricando : Jorge Miguel
 1988 – Chapadão do Bugre (miniseries) : José de Arimatéia
 1989 – Que Rei Sou Eu? : Jean Pierre
 1990 – Brasileiras e Brasileiros : Totó – SBT
 1992 – Deus nos Acuda : Ricardo Bismark
 1993 – Fera Ferida : Raimundo Flamel / Feliciano Júnior
 1995 – Decadência (miniseries) : Mariel Batista
 1995 – Explode Coração : Júlio Falcão
 1997 – A Justiceira (series) : Jamil
 1998 – Dona Flor e seus dois maridos (miniseries) – Vadinho
 1998 – Torre de Babel – Henrique Toledo
 1999 – Vila Madalena : Solano
 2000 – Aquarela do Brasil (miniseries) : Hélio Aguiar
 2001 – As Filhas da Mãe : Edmilson Rocha
 2001 – Sítio do Picapau Amarelo : Dom Quixote
 2002/2003 – Sabor da Paixão : Jean Valjean
 2003/2004 – Celebridade : himself
 2005 – América : Glauco Lopes Prado
 2006/2007 – Páginas da Vida : Sílvio Duarte
 2008 – Beleza Pura : Guilherme Medeiros
 2011 – Araguaia : Fernando Rangel
 2012 – Guerra dos Sexos : Felipe de Alcántara Pereira Barreto
 2014/2015 – Alto Astral : Marcelo Barbosa
 2017 – A Força do Querer : Raul Dantas Sabóia (Dantas)
 2018 – O Tempo Não Para : Dom Sabino

Movies 
 1981 – Asa Branca – Um Sonho Brasileiro
 1981 – Os Vagabundos Trapalhões
 1983 – Inocência
 1985 – Ópera do Malandro
 1986 – Brasa Adormecida
 1986 – Sexo Frágil
 1997 – For All – O Trampolim da Vitória
 2004 – Sexo, Amor e Traição
 2006 – Diário de um Novo Mundo

Theater 
 1977 – "Errare Humanum Est"
 1978 – "O despertar da primavera"
 1990 – "Calígula"
 1990 – "Ela odeia mel"
 2007 – "Dom Quixote de Lugar Nenhum"

References

External links 

1958 births
Living people
People from Bauru
Brazilian Buddhists
Brazilian people of Italian descent
Brazilian male television actors
Brazilian male telenovela actors
Brazilian male film actors
Brazilian male stage actors
Converts to Buddhism
Universidade Gama Filho alumni